Little Spectacle Island is a small island, with an area of 0.62 ha, part of the Sloping Island Group, lying close to the south-eastern coast of Tasmania, Australia around the Tasman and Forestier Peninsulas, and adjacent Spectacle Island.

Fauna
Recorded breeding seabird species are little penguin, silver gull and crested tern.

References

Sloping Island Group